Eddie Laughton (20 June 190321 March 1952) was an American film actor. Laughton appeared in more than 200 films between 1935 and 1952, and is best known for his work with The Three Stooges.

Career
Laughton's family immigrated to the United States in 1909 and settled in Detroit. He started in vaudeville and managed a vaudeville theatre where Larry Fine, later of the Stooges trio, once played.

The pencil-mustached Laughton was placed under contract by Columbia Pictures in 1935, almost certainly thanks to Fine. Laughton worked at Columbia almost exclusively for 10 years, in features, westerns, short subjects, and serials throughout the 1930s and 1940s. Modern viewers will remember Laughton for his role as "Percy Pomeroy, convict 41144" in the Stooge comedies So Long Mr. Chumps and Beer Barrel Polecats, or as the happy drunk in Loco Boy Makes Good. Laughton was an excellent utility player, useful in good-guy and bad-guy roles alike. (He and fellow Columbia stock player John Tyrrell shared many scenes.) Laughton was also a convincing dialect comedian, playing a French nobleman in Buster Keaton's She's Oil Mine, and an English big-game hunter plastered with pies in the Stooges' In the Sweet Pie and Pie.

In addition to his roles in the Stooge shorts, Laughton traveled with the team between filming schedules, acting as their straight man in personal appearances.

Death
Laughton died of pneumonia on March 21, 1952 just two months after the death of Curly Howard, who died of a massive cerebral hemorrhage. Both Curly and Eddie were born in the same year and were both 48 years old when they died within two months of each other.

Selected filmography

 Three Little Beers (1935)
 Disorder in the Court (1936) - Man Sitting by Letterpress (uncredited)
 A Pain in the Pullman (1936)
 Slippery Silks (1936)
 3 Dumb Clucks (1937)
 Goofs and Saddles (1937)
 It Happened in Hollywood (1937)
 Cash and Carry (1937)
 No Time to Marry (1938)
 Special Inspector (1938)
 Squadron of Honor (1938)
 We Want Our Mummy (1939) - Cab Driver (uncredited) 
 Pest from the West (1939)
 Oily to Bed, Oily to Rise (1939)
 Three Sappy People (1939)
 Beware Spooks! (1939)
 Scandal Sheet (1939)
 Girls of the Road (1940)
The Secret Seven (1940)
 You Nazty Spy! (1940)
 A Plumbing We Will Go (1940)
 Boobs in Arms (1940)
 So Long Mr. Chumps (1941)
 Dutiful But Dumb (1941)
 Meet Boston Blackie (1941)
 I Was a Prisoner on Devil's Island (1941)
 In the Sweet Pie and Pie (1941)
 Across the Sierras (1941)
 Tillie the Toiler (1941)
 Outlaws of the Panhandle (1941)
 The Boogie Man Will Get You (1942)
 Loco Boy Makes Good (1942)
 Cactus Makes Perfect (1942)
 What's the Matador? (1942)
 Parachute Nurse (1942)
 Atlantic Convoy (1942)
 Alias Boston Blackie (1942)
 Stand By All Networks (1942)
 Three Smart Saps (1942)
 Daring Young Man (1942)
 Bullets for Bandits (1942)
 Busy Buddies (1944)
 Sailor's Holiday (1944)
 Idle Roomers (1944)
 Idiots Deluxe (1945) - Courtroom spectator (uncredited)
 Beer Barrel Polecats (1946, in footage from So Long, Mr. Chumps)
 The Perils of Pauline (1947)
 Chicken Every Sunday (1949)

References

External links
 
 

1903 births
1952 deaths
English male film actors
Deaths from pneumonia in California
British expatriate male actors in the United States
20th-century English male actors
20th-century American comedians
Eaton family